Iris chrysophylla, the yellowleaf iris, is a wildflower which ranges from midwestern and southern Oregon west of the Cascades and south to the crest of the Siskiyou Mountains in northern California. The yellowleaf iris grows up to  elevation, most commonly in open, coniferous forests.

Description
This herbaceous perennial grows from compact, dark brown and slender rhizomes. The leaves are linear, finely ribbed, and light green, 25–50 cm long, and may be reddish colored at the base. The flowering stems are simple, solid, and slender, 3–20 cm. The flowers are cream to pale yellow, with dark golden to reddish-brown or lavender veins. The plant flowers from April through June.

References
 Flora of North America Iris chrysophylla
 
 Pacific coast native iris.org: Iris chrysophylla
 USDA Natural Resources Conservation Service Iris chrysophylla

External links
Calflora Database: Iris chrysophylla (golden leaved iris,  yellowleaf iris)
USDA Plants Profile for Iris chrysophylla (yellowleaf iris)

chrysophylla
Flora of California
Flora of Oregon
Flora of the Klamath Mountains
Taxa named by John Thomas Howell